This is a list of bestselling novels in the United States in the 1950s, as determined by Publishers Weekly. The list features the most popular novels of each year from 1950 through 1959.

The standards set for inclusion in the lists – which, for example, led to the exclusion of the novels in the Harry Potter series from the lists for the 1990s and 2000s – are currently unknown.

1950 
 The Cardinal by Henry Morton Robinson
 Joy Street by Frances Parkinson Keyes
 Across the River and into the Trees by Ernest Hemingway
 The Wall by John Hersey
 Star Money by Kathleen Winsor
 The Parasites by Daphne du Maurier
 Floodtide by Frank Yerby
 Jubilee Trail by Gwen Bristow
 The Adventurer by Mika Waltari
 The Disenchanted by Budd Schulberg

1951 
 From Here to Eternity by James Jones
 The Caine Mutiny by Herman Wouk
 Moses by Sholem Asch
 The Cardinal by Henry Morton Robinson
 A Woman Called Fancy by Frank Yerby
 The Cruel Sea by Nicholas Monsarrat
 Melville Goodwin, U.S.A. by John P. Marquand
 Return to Paradise by James A. Michener
 The Foundling by Cardinal Spellman
 The Wanderer by Mika Waltari

1952 
 The Silver Chalice by Thomas B. Costain
 The Caine Mutiny by Herman Wouk
 East of Eden by John Steinbeck
 My Cousin Rachel by Daphne du Maurier
 Steamboat Gothic by Frances Parkinson Keyes
 Giant by Edna Ferber
 The Old Man and the Sea by Ernest Hemingway
 The Gown of Glory by Agnes Sligh Turnbull
 The Saracen Blade by Frank Yerby
 The Houses in Between by Howard Spring

1953 
 The Robe by Lloyd C. Douglas
 The Silver Chalice by Thomas B. Costain
 Desirée by Annemarie Selinko
 Battle Cry by Leon M. Uris
 From Here to Eternity by James Jones
 The High and the Mighty by Ernest K. Gann
 Beyond This Place by A. J. Cronin
 Time and Time Again by James Hilton
 Lord Vanity by Samuel Shellabarger
 The Unconquered by Ben Ames Williams

1954 
 Not as a Stranger by Morton Thompson
 Mary Anne by Daphne du Maurier
 Love Is Eternal by Irving Stone
 The Royal Box by Frances Parkinson Keyes
 The Egyptian by Mika Waltari
 No Time for Sergeants by Mac Hyman
 Sweet Thursday by John Steinbeck
 The View from Pompey's Head by Hamilton Basso
 Never Victorious, Never Defeated by Taylor Caldwell
 Benton's Row by Frank Yerby

1955 
 Marjorie Morningstar by Herman Wouk
 Auntie Mame by Patrick Dennis
 Andersonville by MacKinlay Kantor
 Bonjour Tristesse by Françoise Sagan
 The Man in the Gray Flannel Suit by Sloan Wilson
 Something of Value by Robert Ruark
 Not as a Stranger by Morton Thompson
 No Time for Sergeants by Mac Hyman
 The Tontine by Thomas B. Costain
 Ten North Frederick by John O'Hara

1956 
 Don't Go Near the Water by William Brinkley
 The Last Hurrah by Edwin O'Connor
 Peyton Place by Grace Metalious
 Auntie Mame by Patrick Dennis
 Eloise by Kay Thompson
 Andersonville by MacKinlay Kantor
 A Certain Smile by Françoise Sagan
 The Tribe That Lost Its Head by Nicholas Monsarrat
 The Mandarins by Simone de Beauvoir
 Boon Island by Kenneth Roberts

1957 
 By Love Possessed by James Gould Cozzens
 Peyton Place by Grace Metalious
 Compulsion by Meyer Levin
 Rally 'Round the Flag, Boys! by Max Shulman
 Blue Camellia by Frances Parkinson Keyes
 Eloise in Paris by Kay Thompson
 The Scapegoat by Daphne du Maurier
 On the Beach by Nevil Shute
 Below the Salt by Thomas B. Costain
 Atlas Shrugged by Ayn Rand

1958 
 Doctor Zhivago by Boris Pasternak
 Anatomy of a Murder by Robert Traver
 Lolita by Vladimir Nabokov
 Around the World with Auntie Mame by Patrick Dennis
 From the Terrace by John O'Hara
 Eloise at Christmastime by Kay Thompson
 Ice Palace by Edna Ferber
 The Winthrop Woman by Anya Seton
 The Enemy Camp by Jerome Weidman
 Victorine by Frances Parkinson Keyes

1959 
 Exodus by Leon Uris
 Doctor Zhivago by Boris Pasternak
 Hawaii by James A. Michener
 Advise and Consent by Allen Drury
 Lady Chatterley's Lover by D. H. Lawrence
 The Ugly American by Eugene L. Burdick
 Dear and Glorious Physician by Taylor Caldwell
 Lolita by Vladimir Nabokov
 Mrs. 'Arris Goes to Paris by Paul Gallico
 Poor No More by Robert Ruark

References 

1950s in the United States
Novels
1950s books